The Molochna, is a river in the Zaporizhzhia Oblast of south Ukraine. Literally the name of the river translates as Milky. The river is connected with the Russian Mennonite culture, once based in the southeastern region of Ukraine since 1804 as Molotschna colony which was part of the Russian Empire at that time.

In antiquity the river was called Gerrhus  or Gerrus. The river was called Tokmak by the Nogais.

It flows into the Molochnyi Estuary in the Azov Sea. Its length is 197 km and its drainage basin is 3,450 km². A former island in the river contains the archaeological site of Kamyana Mohyla.

Cities and towns in the watershed

 Melitopol
 Molochansk
 Tokmak

See also

 Molotschna
 Molochny, near Murmansk

References

Drainage basins of the Sea of Azov
Rivers of Zaporizhzhia Oblast